Bayesian quadrature 
is a method for approximating intractable integration problems. It falls within the class of probabilistic numerical methods. Bayesian quadrature views numerical integration as a Bayesian inference task, where function evaluations are used to estimate the integral of that function. For this reason, it is sometimes also referred to as "Bayesian probabilistic numerical integration" or "Bayesian numerical integration".  The name "Bayesian cubature" is also sometimes used when the integrand is multi-dimensional.  A potential advantage of this approach is that it provides probabilistic uncertainty quantification for the value of the integral.

Bayesian quadrature

Numerical integration 

Let  be a function defined on a domain  (where typically ).
 

The name "quadrature" comes from the fact that the posterior mean on  sometimes takes the form of a quadrature rule whose weights are determined by the choice of prior.

Bayesian quadrature with gaussian processes 

Suppose we have a Gaussian process with prior mean function  and covariance function (or kernel function) .

The function 
In particular, note that the posterior mean is a quadrature rule with weights 

In more challenging integration problems, where the prior distribution cannot be relied upon as a meaningful representation of epistemic uncertainty, it is necessary to use the data  to set the kernel hyperparameters using, for example, maximum likelihood estimation.  The estimation of kernel hyperparameters introduces adaptivity into Bayesian quadrature.

Example 

Consider estimation of the integral

using a Bayesian quadrature rule based on a zero-mean Gaussian process prior with the Matérn covariance function of smoothness  and correlation length .
This covariance function is

It is straightforward (though tedious) to compute that

Advantages and disadvantages 
Since Bayesian quadrature is an example of probabilistic numerics, it inherits certain advantages compared with traditional numerical integration methods:

 It allows uncertainty to be quantified and propagated through all subsequent computations to explicitly model the impact of numerical error. 
 It permits more efficient use of information, e.g. jointly inferring multiple related quantities of interest or using active learning to reduce the required number of points.

Despite these merits, Bayesian quadrature methods possess the following limitations:

E.g. for Bayesian quadrature with Gaussian processes, the kernel mean embedding  has no closed-form expression for a general kernel  and measure .

 The computational cost of Bayesian quadrature methods based on Gaussian processes is in general  due to the cost of inverting  matrices, which may defy their applications to large-scale problems.

Algorithmic design

Prior distributions 

This is mainly due to the advantage provided by Gaussian conjugacy and the fact that Gaussian processes can encode a wide range of prior knowledge including smoothness, periodicity and sparsity through a careful choice of prior covariance. However, a number of other prior distributions have also been proposed. This includes multi-output Gaussian processes, which are particularly useful when tackling multiple related numerical integration tasks simultaneously or sequentially, and tree-based priors such as Bayesian additive regression trees, which are well suited for discontinuous . Additionally, Dirichlet processes priors have also been proposed for the integration measure .

Point selection 

The points  are either considered to be given, or can be selected so as to ensure the posterior on  concentrates at a faster rate. One approach consists of using point sets from other quadrature rules. For example, taking independent and identically distributed realisations from  recovers a Bayesian approach to Monte Carlo, whereas using certain deterministic point sets such as low-discrepancy sequences or lattices recovers a Bayesian alternative to quasi-Monte Carlo. It is of course also possible to use point sets specifically designed for Bayesian quadrature; see for example the work of 
 who exploited symmetries in point sets to obtain scalable Bayesian quadrature estimators. Alternatively, points can also be selected adaptively following principles from active learning and Bayesian experimental design so as to directly minimise posterior uncertainty, including for multi-output Gaussian processes.

Kernel mean and initial error 

One of the challenges when implementing Bayesian quadrature is the need to evaluate the function  and the constant . The former is commonly called the kernel mean, and is a quantity which is key to the computation of kernel-based distances such as the maximum mean discrepancy. The latter is commonly called the initial error since it provides an upper bound on the integration error before any function values are observed. Unfortunately, the kernel mean and initial error can only be computed for a small number of   pairs; see for example Table 1 in.

Theory 

There have been a number of theoretical guarantees derived for Bayesian quadrature. These usually require Sobolev smoothness properties of the integrand, although recent work also extends to integrands in the reproducing kernel Hilbert space of the Gaussian kernel. Most of the results apply to the case of Monte Carlo or deterministic grid point sets, but some results also extend to adaptive designs.

Software 
 ProbNum: Probabilistic numerical methods in Python, including a Bayesian quadrature implementation.
 Emukit: Emulation and decision making under uncertainty in Python.
 QMCPy: Bayesian quadrature with QMC point sets in Python.

References 

Numerical integration (quadrature)
Bayesian inference